The Jiaqing Emperor had a total number of 14 consorts, including 2 empresses, 2 imperial noble consorts, 4 consorts and 6 concubines.

Empresses 

 Empress Xiaoshurui (1796-1797)
 Empress Xiaoherui (1797-1820), later honoured as Mother Empress, Empress Dowager Gongci. She held the title to her death in 1850.

Imperial Noble Consorts 

 Imperial Noble Consort Heyu, the longest living consort of the emperor
 Imperial Noble Consort Gongshun, the last imperial consort interred at Emperor's Mausoleum

Consorts

1.Consort Shu 
Consort Shu (恕妃 完颜氏; d.1792) was a member of an ancient Wanyan clan.

Father: Hafeng'a (哈丰阿), held a title of master commandant of light chariot (轻车都尉, pinyin: qingcheduwei)

One sister: A primary consort of Prince Zhuangxiang of the First Rank, Mianke (庄襄亲王 绵课 嫡福晋)

Qianlong era 
Lady Wanyan entered the residence of Prince Jia of the First Rank in 1786 and was granted a title "Secondary Consort" (侧福晋). Her father became a general of Eight Banners in Shaanxi, later wrote a memorial thanking for the grace of his daughter. She remained childless until her death in 1792.

Legacy 
In 1797, lady Wanyan was posthumously given a title "Consort Shu" (恕妃, "shu" meaning "forgiving"). Her coffin was interred in 1803 at Chang Mausoleum in the Western Qing tombs.

2.Consort Hua

3. Consort Xin

4.Consort Zhuang

Concubines

1. Concubine Jian 
Concubine Jian (d. 14 May 1780)  was a booi aha of the Han Chinese Bordered Yellow Banner Guan clan. Her personal name wasn't recorded in history

Father: Decheng, a baitangga (拜唐阿)

One younger brother: Aibao (爱保), served as baitangga (拜唐阿)

Qianlong era 
It is not known when lady Guan married Yongyan, Qianlong Emperor's 15th son as a mistress. On 14 May 1780, she gave birth to Yongyan's first daughter. Unfortunately, Lady Guan died during the labour. Her sole daughter left the world on 24 November 1783.

Legacy 
On  11 May 1797 (22nd day of the 4th month of the Jiaqing era), lady Guan was posthumously conferred a title "Concubine Jian" (简嫔). According to the poem "Swangoose sees through needs" from 1801, "jian" means "moderate" in Manchu, but "humble" in Chinese. Lady Guan's brother, Aibao, gave thanks to Jiaqing Emperor for the promotion of his sister. Her coffin was temporarily placed in Jinganzhuang Grieving Palace where additional promotional rites were performed. Concubine Jian was interred at the Chang Mausoleum in Western Qing tombs.

Titles 
During Qianlong era:

 Lady Guan
 Mistress (格格)

During Jiaqing era:

 Concubine Jian (简嫔) - from 11 May 1797

Issue 
First daughter (14 May 1780 – 24 November 1783)

2. Concubine Xun 
Concubine Xun (31 December 1786) was Han Chinese Booi Aha of the Plain Yellow Banner Shen clan. Her personal name wasn't recorded in history.

Father: Yonghe (永和), served as a fellow attendant of the Grand Minister of Internal Affairs (内务府大臣职衔, pinyin: neiwufu dachen zhixian).

Qianlong era 
It is not known when lady Shen entered the residence of Prince Jia of the First Rank, Yongyan as his mistress. On 31 December 1786, she gave birth to Yongyan's fifth daughter. Lady Shen died after the labour. Her daughter died in June/July 1795.

Legacy 
After the coronation of Jiaqing Emperor, Lady Shen was posthumously granted a title "Concubine Xun" (逊嫔; "xun" means "modest"). In 1818, Concubine Xun's daughter was given a title "Princess Hui'an of the Second Rank" (慧安和硕公主, "Hui'an" meaning "clever and peaceful"). Lady Shen's coffin was temporarily placed in Jinganzhuang Grieving Palace where additional promotional rites were performed. Concubine Xun was interred at the Chang Mausoleum in Western Qing tombs.

Titles 
Mistress (格格)

Issue 
Princess Hui'an of the Second Rank (慧安和碩公主; 31 December 1786 – June/July 1795), fifth daughter

3. Concubine Rong

4. Concubine Chun 
Concubine Chun (淳嬪 董佳氏; d. 30 November 1819) was a member of Donggiya clan . Her personal name wasn't recorded in history.

 Father: Changshitai (长时太), served as a military official (署军, pinyin: shujun).

Jiaqing era 
Lady Donggiya entered the Forbidden City in 1798 as "Noble Lady Chun" (淳贵人, "chun" means "honest"). In May 1801, Noble Lady Chun was promoted to Concubine Chun (淳嫔). She died on 30 November 1819. Concubine Chun remained childless during Jiaqing era.

Titles 
淳貴人→淳嬪

5. Concubine En

6.Concubine An 
Concubine An (1 March 1785 – 29 July 1837) was a member of a prominent Gūwalgiya clan belonging to the Plain White Banner. Concubine An was incorporated into the Bordered Yellow Banner. Her personal name wasn't recorded in history.

 Father: Anying,  served as second class imperial guard (二等侍卫, pinyin: erdeng shiwei) and held a title of first class Xinyong duke (一等信勇公, pinyin: yideng xinyong gong)
 Paternal grandfather: Fuxing (復興), served as a left censor (左都御史，pinyin: zuoduyushi), a secretary in the Ministry of Public Works and a General of Wulisutai (乌里苏台将军, pinyin: wulisutai jiangjun)

Qianlong era 
Concubine An was born on the 1 March 1785.

Jiaqing era 
Lady Guwalgiya entered Forbidden City in 1801 after triennial Elegant Women Selection and was given a title "First Class Female Attendant An" (安常在, "an" meaning "peaceful"). Her residence in the Forbidden City was Palace of Earthly Honor (翊坤宫). "Draft History of Qing" mentions that First Class Female Attendant An didn't receive her promotional document. She remained childless during Jiaqing era and was never promoted.

Daoguang era 
In August 1821, Lady Guwalgiya was promoted to  "Dowager Concubine An" (皇考安嫔). She lived together with Concubine Rong and Consort Xin in the Eastern Longevity Palace (寿东宫). Concubine An died on 29 July 1837 at 3 am and was interred in Chang Mausoleum in Western Qing tombs.

Occupation of the Forbidden City by imperial consorts

References 

Consorts of the Jiaqing Emperor